The Rocky Mountain Collegian is the daily student newspaper of Colorado State University. Founded in 1891, the paper is one of the oldest daily student newspapers west of the Mississippi River and is the only student-run daily newspaper in the state of Colorado. In 2010, the Collegian was ranked one of the top three daily student newspapers in the nation by the Society of Professional Journalists.

The publication is not an official publication of Colorado State University, but is published by the independent 501(c)3 non-profit Rocky Mountain Student Media Corporation using the name ‘The Rocky Mountain Collegian’ pursuant to a license granted by CSU. The Rocky Mountain Collegian is a 5,000-circulation student-run newspaper intended as a public forum. It publishes digitally four days a week, Monday through Thursday, and in print each Thursday. During the regular fall and spring semesters breaking news and sports coverage is occasionally published on Fridays, Saturday and Sundays. Corrections may be submitted to the editor-in-chief at errors@collegian.com and will be printed and corrected online as necessary. The Collegian is a complimentary publication for the Fort Collins community. The first copy is free. Additional copies are 25 cents each.

The Collegian won the Silver Crown Award from the Columbia Scholastic Press Association for its work in the fall semester of 2008. Its investigative team has received both the Robert Novak Collegiate Journalism Award and its writers have received numerous college journalism accolades throughout the years.

The Rocky Mountain Collegian is an affiliate of UWIRE, which distributes and promotes its content to their network.

Editorial staff 
The Collegian editorial staff for the spring 2021 semester are:
 Editor-in-chief: Lauryn Bolz
 Content managing editor: Abby Vander Graaff
 Digital and design managing editor: Matt Tackett
 Night editor: Renee Ziel
 News director: Laura Studley
 News editor: Serena Bettis
 Opinion editor: Katrina Leibee
 Sports director: Scott Nies
 Arts & culture director: Noah Pasley
 Arts & culture editor: Maddy Erskine
 Design director: Amy Noble
 Design editor: Katrina Clasen
 Design editor: Charlie Dillon
 Photography editor: Devin Cornelius
 Photography editor: Luke Bourland
 Social media editor: Jeremy King
 Student media advisor: Jake Sherlock

Notable awards

Associated Collegiate Press Pacemaker Awards 
The National Pacemaker Awards are awards for excellence in American student journalism, given annually since 1927. The awards are generally considered to be the highest national honors in their field, and are unofficially known as the "Pulitzer Prizes of student journalism."

2017:

Online Pacemaker (1st place); Editor - Julia Rentsch

2014:

Newspaper Pacemaker (1st place), Four-year Daily Newspaper; Editor - Andrew Carrera & Kate Winkle

2013:

Design of the Year (4th place), Newspaper Page/Spread; Corinne Winthrop

Design of the Year (Honorable Mention), Illustration; Corinne Winthrop

2010:

Story of the Year (2nd place), News Story; J. David McSwane

Multimedia Story of the Year (2nd place), Multimedia News; Staff of The Rocky Mountain Collegian

Design of the Year (Honorable Mention), News Magazine/Special; Nick Marranzino

2007:

Photo Excellence (1st place), News Picture; Aaron Montoya

Story of the Year (Honorable Mention), Feature Story; Brandon Lowrey

2005:

Photo Excellence (Honorable Mention), Feature Picture; Ryan Maier

2004:

Newspaper Pacemaker (1st place); Editor - Shandra Jordan

1995:

Newspaper Pacemaker (Winner)

Society of Professional Journalists Mark Of Excellence National Winners and Finalists since 2000 
The Mark of Excellence Awards annually honors the best in student journalism in print, radio, television and online collegiate journalism. Entries are judged regionally, and first-place regional winners advance to the national competition.

2016

Best Affiliated Website (Finalist)

2015

General News Reporting, Erin Douglas (Finalist)

2013

Best Use of Multimedia, Hannah Glennon, Hunter Thompson and Corinne Winthrop (Finalist)

General Column Writing, Zane Womeldorph (Finalist)

2012

Breaking News Photography, Dylan Langille (Finalist)

2011

Breaking News Photography, Hunter Thompson (Finalist)

Photo Illustration, Hunter Thompson (1st place)

2010

Best All-Around Daily Student Newspaper (Finalist)

2008

Online Feature Reporting, Staff (Finalist)

2005

Feature Writing, Caroline Welch (Finalist)

2004

Spot News Reporting, J.J. Babb (1st place)

General News Reporting, Amy Resseguie (1st place)

2002

Spot News Reporting, Vince Blaser, Josh Hardin and Summer McElley (3rd place)

Sports Writing,  Jason Graziadei (1st place)
2001
Best All-Around Daily Student Newspaper (Finalist)

Controversy
On September 21, 2007, the paper’s editorial board ran the words “Taser This… Fuck Bush” in large bold font as an editorial. Members of the board stated that the editorial was a response to the University of Florida Taser incident, which had occurred earlier that week. Then-President Larry Penley responded: "While student journalists enjoy all the privileges and protections of the first amendment, they must also accept full responsibility for the choices they make. Members of a university community ought to be expected to communicate civilly and rationally and to make thoughtful arguments in support of even unpopular viewpoints." Community members and the campus’ College Republicans called upon Colorado State University’s Board of Student Communications to dismiss Editor-in-chief J. David McSwane, who had final say in all matters of editorial content. After a heated public hearing and a closed-door meeting with witnesses, the board chose only to admonish McSwane for violation of two guidelines in the university’s student media code: use of profane language in an editorial and using poor judgment in framing the editorial.

The university and Penley were not finished scrutinizing the Collegian, however. Penley began private conversations with the local, Gannett-owned newspaper, The Fort Collins Coloradoan, so that the Coloradoan would enter a "strategic partnership" with the Collegian and run it as part of the for-profit Gannett chain. Student-journalists caught wind of a January 2008 meeting between Penley and then-Coloradoan Publisher Christine Chin, and showed up uninvited and unannounced to voice their displeasure. They were turned away.

"This takes privatization in a whole new direction and threatens the very core of student press freedom on that campus," wrote Kathy Lawrence, director of student media at the University of Texas-Austin, and a former College Media Association president. "Everyone who cares about an independent student press needs to sound the alarm loudly."

Penley and the university released a statement on January 23, 2008, and announced that CSU would accept a formal proposal from Gannett for their "partnership." The university in February 2008 formed an "advisory committee" to review the structure of the Collegian and to review proposals from Gannett and other interested suitors. The proposal offer was eventually extended to other corporate entities and to the then-Department of Student Media, which had been running the Collegian's business affairs — as well as those of CTV, KCSU-FM radio and College Avenue magazine. University officials eventually accepted a proposal by Student Media Director Jeff Browne, that would create a non-profit media company working through a contract with CSU, to provide media services and news to the student body and to the community. The university's Board of Governors adopted the plan in May 2008, and the Rocky Mountain Student Media Corporation began operations that summer.

Larry Penley's term as CSU president ended abruptly in November 2008 with his resignation under fire. A Colorado Independent investigation uncovered Penley's questionable handling of money, including shifting money away from academic colleges and the library and into athletic department coffers, and the tripling of his own office's budget.

References

External links
 Official website

Colorado State University
Publications established in 1891
Student newspapers published in Colorado